Jean Anastasi (born 16 December 1935) is a French former professional racing cyclist. He rode in three editions of the Tour de France.

References

External links
 

1935 births
Living people
French male cyclists
Cyclists from Marseille